Brahima Guindo (born 9 September 1977) is a Malian judoka. Won a bronze medal at the 1999 Pan-African Games, and a bronze medal at the 2000 African Judo Championships.

Achievements

References

External links
 

1977 births
Living people
Malian male judoka
Judoka at the 2000 Summer Olympics
Olympic judoka of Mali
21st-century Malian people
African Games medalists in judo
Competitors at the 1999 All-Africa Games
African Games bronze medalists for Mali